Victor Kaleb Canales (born July 7, 1978) is an American basketball coach who last served as  assistant coach for the Indiana Pacers of the National Basketball Association (NBA).

Early career
Born in Laredo, Texas, Canales is a graduate of John B. Alexander High School. He graduated from the University of Texas at Arlington with a degree in kinesiology. He later earned a master's degree in sports leadership from Virginia Commonwealth University.

Canales began his coaching career as an assistant coach in 2001 at United High School of Laredo. The following year, Canales became an assistant coach at Martin High School also in Laredo. In 2003, Canales returned to UT Arlington to be an assistant coach.

NBA coaching career
In 2005, Canales was hired as a video intern for the Portland Trail Blazers, and was eventually hired as the team's video coordinator. In 2009, he was promoted to an assistant coach for the team. In 2010, Canales served as the Trail Blazers' head coach during the NBA Summer League. He was promoted to interim head coach of the Trail Blazers after head coach Nate McMillan was dismissed on March 15, 2012. Canales became the youngest active head coach in the NBA and the first Mexican-American coach in NBA history. In 2012, Portland hired Terry Stotts as their head coach, but Canales remained with the team as an assistant.

On May 3, 2013, Canales accepted an assistant coaching job with the Dallas Mavericks.

In 2018, Canales was hired as an assistant coach for the New York Knicks under David Fizdale. Canales remained with the team after Fizdale was fired in 2019 and worked under interim head coach Mike Miller.

On November 13, 2020, Canales was hired as an assistant coach by the Indiana Pacers under Nate Bjorkgren.

Head coaching record

|-
| style="text-align:left;"|Portland
| style="text-align:left;"|
| 23 || 8 || 15 ||  || style="text-align:center;"|4th in Northwest || — || — || — || —
| style="text-align:center;"|Missed playoffs
|- class="sortbottom"
| style="text-align:center;" colspan="2"|Career
| 23 || 8 || 15 ||  ||   || — || — || — || — ||

References

1978 births
Living people
American sportspeople of Mexican descent
Basketball coaches from Texas
Dallas Mavericks assistant coaches
High school basketball coaches in Texas
Laredo Community College alumni
People from Laredo, Texas
Portland Trail Blazers assistant coaches
Portland Trail Blazers head coaches
UT Arlington Mavericks men's basketball coaches
University of Texas at Arlington alumni
Virginia Commonwealth University alumni